St. James's Cathedral, is the Anglican cathedral of the Diocese of Athabasca: it is in Peace River, Alberta,  and celebrated its centenary in 2012.

References
 

St. Matthew's
Anglican church buildings in Alberta
20th-century Anglican church buildings in Canada